Cecília Hartmann-Berkes (born 14 February 1931) is a Hungarian sprint canoeist who competed in the 1950s. Competing in two Summer Olympics, she earned her best finish of fourth in the K-1 500 m event at Melbourne in 1956. She was born in Budapest, Kingdom of Hungary.

External links
Cecilia Hartmann's profile at Sports Reference.com
 

1931 births
People from Budapest
Canoeists at the 1952 Summer Olympics
Canoeists at the 1956 Summer Olympics
Hungarian female canoeists
Olympic canoeists of Hungary
Possibly living people
20th-century Hungarian women